The 2010 United States Senate election in Wisconsin was held on November 2, 2010. Incumbent Democratic U.S. Senator Russ Feingold ran for re-election to a fourth term, but was defeated by Republican challenger Ron Johnson, a businessman and first-time candidate. Johnson was the first Republican to win a Senate election in Wisconsin since 1986. Feingold also became the fifth Senator in a row from Wisconsin's Class 3 Senate seat to be defeated for re-election in the general election, and the seventh in a row overall to lose reelection by a defeat in either the primary or general elections.

Republican primary

Candidates 
On the ballot
 Stephen Finn, plumber
 Ron Johnson, businessman
 Dave Westlake, businessman

Declined
 Ted Kanavas, state senator
 Dick Leinenkugel (dropped out), former State Commerce Secretary
 Tommy Thompson, former governor of Wisconsin
 Terrence Wall (dropped out), real estate developer

Campaign 
Former Republican Governor of Wisconsin Tommy Thompson had expressed an interest in challenging Feingold, but ruled himself out of the race in April 2010.

Johnson, a millionaire manufacturer and Tea Party movement favorite running for political office for the first time, was the frontrunner. In response to controversy over his ownership of stock in British Petroleum (BP), Johnson said he would sell it when market conditions were favorable and possibly use the proceeds to help finance his Senate campaign. Johnson was endorsed by: the Club for Growth, a fiscally conservative advocacy organization; former Wisconsin Republican Lt. Governor Margaret Farrow; Republican U.S. Senator Jim DeMint of South Carolina; and Wisconsin Republican U.S. Representatives Jim Sensenbrenner, Tom Petri and Paul Ryan. Businessman David Westlake was endorsed by the Republican Liberty Caucus. According to OpenSecrets, as of August 25, 2010, Johnson had invested $4.3 million of his own money into his campaign; this amount represented 71 percent of his campaign funds, while 27 percent of his campaign funds ($1.6 million) came from individual contributions.

Polling

Results

General election

Candidates 
 Russ Feingold (D), incumbent U.S. senator
 Ron Johnson (R), businessman
 Dave Rutowski (I)
 Rob Taylor (I) self-described Constitution Party candidate

Campaign 
Feingold's first television ad was a positive ad released in March. In July 2010, Feingold's second 2010 television election ad attacked Johnson for alleged support for offshore drilling in the Great Lakes. Johnson quickly countered Feingold with a television ad of his own. Feingold's logo was Moving Forward. In one ad, he emphasized independence and called himself a "penny pincher." Johnson argued that manufacturers and accountants were underrepresented in the U.S. Senate, and there were too many lawyers (57 out of 100 members,  including Feingold). Feingold received the endorsements of the Milwaukee Journal Sentinel and the Green Bay Press-Gazette. The Beloit Daily News endorsed Johnson.

Debates 
 October 8 in Milwaukee
 October 11 in Wausau
 October 22 in Eau Claire on WQOW

Predictions

Polling

Fundraising 
Through December 31, 2010:

Results

References

External links 
 Elections & Voting at the Wisconsin Government Accountability Board
 Candidate list
 U.S. Congress candidates for Wisconsin at Project Vote Smart
 Wisconsin U.S. Senate from OurCampaigns.com
 Campaign contributions from Open Secrets
  2010 Wisconsin Senate General Election: All Head-to-Head Matchups] graph of multiple polls from Pollster.com
 Election 2010: Wisconsin Senate from Rasmussen Reports
 2010 Wisconsin Senate Race from Real Clear Politics
 2010 Wisconsin Senate Race from CQ Politics
 Race profile from The New York Times
 Election 2010 news coverage at the Milwaukee Journal Sentinel
Official campaign websites (Archived)
 Russ Feingold for U.S. Senate incumbent
 Ron Johnson for Senate
 Dave Westlake for U.S. Senate

Wisconsin
2010
2010 Wisconsin elections